Warsaw Township may refer to:

Warsaw Township, Hancock County, Illinois
Warsaw Township, Goodhue County, Minnesota
Warsaw Township, Rice County, Minnesota
Warsaw Township, Jefferson County, Pennsylvania

See also
Warsaw (disambiguation)#United States

Township name disambiguation pages